Eugen Buktenica (1914–1997) was a Croatian painter. His works can be found at the Croatian Museum of Naïve Art in Zagreb. He was born in Grohote on the island of Šolta. The nature and life on the island in the Mediterranean provided the most subjects of his paintings

References

1914 births
1997 deaths
20th-century Croatian painters
Croatian male painters
20th-century Croatian male artists